Roger Federer defeated James Blake in the final, 6–0, 6–3, 6–4 to win the singles tennis title at the 2006 Tennis Masters Cup. It was his third Tour Finals title.

David Nalbandian was the defending champion, but was defeated in the semifinals by Blake.

Seeds

Alternates

Draw

Finals

Red group
Standings are determined by: 1. number of wins; 2. number of matches; 3. in two-players-ties, head-to-head records; 4. in three-players-ties, percentage of sets won, or of games won; 5. steering-committee decision.

Gold group
Standings are determined by: 1. number of wins; 2. number of matches; 3. in two-players-ties, head-to-head records; 4. in three-players-ties, percentage of sets won, or of games won; 5. steering-committee decision.

See also
ATP World Tour Finals appearances

External links
Draw

Singles